is a train station of West Japan Railway Company (JR-West) in Minamiyamashiro, Kyoto, Japan.

Lines

Layout
The station has one island platform and one side platform serving three tracks. The platforms and the station building are connected by an overpass.

Platforms

Passenger statistics
According to the Kyoto Prefecture statistical report, the average number of passengers per day is as follows.

See also
 List of railway stations in Japan

External links

  

Railway stations in Kyoto Prefecture